Ronald Paul Burns (born 13 March 1973) is a former Indigenous Australian rules footballer for the Geelong Football Club and Adelaide Crows in the Australian Football League (AFL).

Biography
Burns is the nephew of former footballers Tony and Benny Vigona.

Playing career
Originally from St Mary's Football Club of the Northern Territory Football League, Burns moved to Western Australia and played colts football for Claremont Football Club before moving back to Darwin. He was lured back to Perth by the West Perth Football Club before being drafted to the Geelong Cats in the AFL. Burns led the Cats in goalkicking 5 times, playing as a small crumbing forward during a less decorated time for the club.

After a period of poor play, the Cats traded Burns to the Adelaide Crows for Ben Finnin, who ultimately did not play a game for the Cats. Burns played out the rest of his career with the Crows, but failed to make the same impact as he had made for the Cats.

Burns played 154 games and kicked 262 goals from 1995 to 2004.

References 

Geelong Football Club players
Adelaide Football Club players
Allies State of Origin players
West Perth Football Club players
St Mary's Football Club (NTFL) players
Port Fairy Football Club players
Indigenous Australian players of Australian rules football
Australian rules footballers from the Northern Territory
1973 births
Living people
Heywood Football Club players
Port Adelaide Magpies players